Kangrali (BK) is a census town in Belgaum district in the Indian state of Karnataka.

Demographics
 India census, Kangrali (BK) had a population of 10,084. Males constitute 51% of the population and females 49%. Kangrali (BK) has an average literacy rate of 67%, higher than the national average of 59.5%: male literacy is 76%, and female literacy is 57%. In Kangrali (BK), 14% of the population is under 6 years of age.

References

Cities and towns in Belagavi district